Xining railway station is the main railway station serving the city of Xining in Qinghai, China. It is the first station on the Qinghai–Tibet Railway which connects the city with Lhasa in Tibet.

History
The station opened in 1959.
It underwent a major expansion in time for the opening of the Lanzhou–Xinjiang High-Speed Railway in December 2014.

Gallery

See also
List of stations on Qinghai–Tibet railway

References

Buildings and structures in Xining
Railway stations in Qinghai
Stations on the Lanzhou–Qinghai Railway
Stations on the Qinghai–Tibet Railway